The 1980 National Challenge Cup was the 67th edition of the USSF's annual open soccer championship. Teams from the North American Soccer League declined to participate.  New York Pancyprian-Freedoms defeated Maccabee A.C. in the final game. The score was 3–2.

References

External links
 1980 National Challenge Cup – TheCup.us

National Challenge Cup
U.S. Open Cup